This is a list of the National Register Historic Places in Val Verde County, Texas

This is intended to be a complete list of properties and districts listed on the National Register of Historic Places in Val Verde County, Texas. There are seven districts and four individual properties listed on the National Register in the county. These include one National Historic Landmark District, one State Historic Site, one State Antiquities Landmark, and one Recorded Texas Historic Landmark.

Current listings

The publicly disclosed locations of National Register properties and districts may be seen in a mapping service provided.

|}

See also

National Register of Historic Places listings in Texas
List of Texas State Historic Sites
Recorded Texas Historic Landmarks in Val Verde County

References

External links

Registered Historic Places
Val Verde County